Southmont High School is a public high school located at 6425 US 231 South, unincorporated Montgomery County, Indiana, east of New Market and south of Crawfordsville. It is a part of the South Montgomery Community School Corporation.

Communities served include portions of Crawfordsville, Alamo, Ladoga, Lake Holiday, New Market, New Ross, and Waveland.

Quality of Education 
Southmont High School offers a variety of courses including dual credit and advanced placement courses.  Southmont High School participates in the West Central Career and Technical Education Cooperative.

See also
 Sagamore Conference
 Crawfordsville, Indiana
 List of high schools in Indiana
Other high schools in Montgomery County:
 Crawfordsville High School
 North Montgomery High School

References

External links
South Montgomery Community School Corporation

Schools in Montgomery County, Indiana
Public high schools in Indiana